Visa requirements for Syrian citizens are administrative entry restrictions by the authorities of other states placed on citizens of Syria. As of 1 January 2023, Syrian citizens had visa-free or visa on arrival access to 30 countries and territories, ranking the Syrian passport 106th in terms of travel freedom according to the Henley Passport Index.



Visa requirements map

Visa requirements

Territories and disputed areas
Visa requirements for Syrian citizens for visits to various territories, disputed areas and restricted zones:

See also

Visa policy of Syria
Syrian passport
Foreign relations of Syria

References and Notes
References

Notes

Syria
Foreign relations of Syria